The 2014–15 Tennessee Lady Volunteers basketball team represents the University of Tennessee in the 2014–15 college basketball season. The Lady Vols, led by 3rd year head coach Holly Warlick, played their games at Thompson–Boling Arena and were members of the Southeastern Conference.

They finished the season 30-6, 15-1 SEC play to share the SEC regular season title with South Carolina. They advanced to the SEC women's tournament championship game where they lost to South Carolina. They received an at-large bid to the NCAA women's tournament where they beat Boise State in first round, Pittsburgh in the second round, and Gonzaga in the Sweet Sixteen, before losing last year's Sweet Sixteen rematch to Maryland in the Elite Eight.

In the 2015 SEC women's basketball tournament quarterfinals, senior Ariel Massengale became only the third Tennessee player to have 1,000 points and 500 career assists.

2014–15 Roster

Rankings

Schedule and Results

|-
!colspan=9 style="background:#F77F00; color:white;"| Exhibition

|-
!colspan=9 style="background:#F77F00; color:white;"| Regular Season

|-
!colspan=9 style="background:#F77F00;"| 2015 SEC Tournament

|-
!colspan=9 style="background:#F77F00;"| 2015 NCAA Women's Tournament

Source:

See also
 2014–15 Tennessee Volunteers basketball team

References

Tennessee
Tennessee Lady Volunteers basketball seasons
Tennessee
Volunteers
Volunteers